Thomas Joseph Gibbons (March 22, 1891 – November 19, 1960) was an American professional heavyweight boxer.

Life and career 

He was born on March 22, 1891 in Saint Paul, Minnesota to Thomas John Gibbons and Mary ( Burke) Gibbons. He had a brother, Mike. 

Tommy started boxing professionally in 1911 as a middleweight. Like his brother he was a master scientific boxer who chose to outbox his opponents. In time, he advanced to the heavyweight boxing class and developed a respectable punch.

On May 27, 1916 he married Helen Constance Moga in Saint Paul, Minnesota.

His biggest fight came near the end of his career in Jack Dempsey vs. Tommy Gibbons when he met heavyweight champion Jack Dempsey on July 4, 1923 in Shelby, Montana. The local backers and the town of Shelby went broke putting on the fight. The great Dempsey battled through the full fifteen rounds before winning by decision. Dempsey was awarded $200,000, whereas Gibbons received expense money.	
	
Tommy Gibbons record was 56-4-1 with 44 no decisions, and 1 no contest. He scored 48 knockouts, and was stopped only once by Gene Tunney on June 5, 1925. The names dotting his record read like boxing's hall of fame. Tommy recorded wins over George Chip, Willie Meehan, Billy Miske, Chuck Wiggins, Jack Bloomfield, and Kid Norfolk. Tommy had no decision matches with George "K.O." Brown, Billy Miske, Harry Greb, Battling Levinsky, Bob Roper, Chuck Wiggins, Georges Carpentier, and others. Only Harry Greb, Billy Miske, Jack Dempsey, and Gene Tunney were able to score wins over Gibbons.

Following his retirement from boxing, Tommy Gibbons was elected four times as the Sheriff of Ramsey County. He won for six consecutive four year terms before retiring at the age of 68. He died on November 19, 1960 in Saint Paul, Minnesota.

Legacy
Gibbons became a member of the Ring Boxing Hall of Fame in 1963, and the International Boxing Hall of Fame in 1993, and the Minnesota Boxing Hall of Fame in 2010.

Professional boxing record
All information in this section is derived from BoxRec, unless otherwise stated.

Official record

All newspaper decisions are officially regarded as “no decision” bouts and are not counted in the win/loss/draw column.

Unofficial record

All newspaper decisions are officially regarded as “no decision” bouts and are not counted in the win/loss/draw column.

See also 
Boxing in the 1920s
International Boxing Hall of Fame

References

External links
 

1891 births
1960 deaths
Boxers from Saint Paul, Minnesota
American male boxers
Heavyweight boxers